Jalan Datuk Wira Poh Ah Tiam (Malacca state route ), also known as Jalan Lorong Pandan, is a major highway in Malacca state, Malaysia. It was built in April 2007 and was named after former Malacca's State Assemblyman for Machap and also State Housing and Local Government Committee, Datuk Wira Poh Ah Tiam.

List of junctions

Highways in Malaysia
Roads in Malacca